In Greek mythology, the name Alcimus or Alkimos (Ancient Greek: Ἄλκιμος) may refer to:

Alcimus, a companion of Achilles; he and Automedon were the two most favored by Achilles after Patroclus' death. Possibly the same as the Alcimus killed by Deiphobus.
Alcimus, one of the sons of Hippocoon. He had a heroon in Sparta.
Alcimus, father of Mentor (Odyssey).
Alcimus, son of Neleus.
Alkimos, one of the comrades of the Greek hero Odysseus. When the latter and 12 of his crew came into the port of Sicily, the Cyclops Polyphemus seized and confined them. Along with the Ithacan king and six others namely: Lycaon, Amphialos, Amphidamas, Antilochus and Eurylochos, Alcimus survived the manslaughter of his six companions by the monster.

See also 

 12714 Alkimos, Jovian asteroid

Notes

References 

 Homer, The Iliad with an English Translation by A.T. Murray, Ph.D. in two volumes. Cambridge, MA., Harvard University Press; London, William Heinemann, Ltd. 1924. . Online version at the Perseus Digital Library.
Homer, Homeri Opera in five volumes. Oxford, Oxford University Press. 1920. . Greek text available at the Perseus Digital Library.
 Homer, The Odyssey with an English Translation by A.T. Murray, PH.D. in two volumes. Cambridge, MA., Harvard University Press; London, William Heinemann, Ltd. 1919. . Online version at the Perseus Digital Library. Greek text available from the same website.
 Pausanias, Description of Greece with an English Translation by W.H.S. Jones, Litt.D., and H.A. Ormerod, M.A., in 4 Volumes. Cambridge, MA, Harvard University Press; London, William Heinemann Ltd. 1918. Online version at the Perseus Digital Library
 Pausanias, Graeciae Descriptio. 3 vols. Leipzig, Teubner. 1903.  Greek text available at the Perseus Digital Library.
 Quintus Smyrnaeus, The Fall of Troy translated by Way. A. S. Loeb Classical Library Volume 19. London: William Heinemann, 1913. Online version at theio.com
 Quintus Smyrnaeus, The Fall of Troy. Arthur S. Way. London: William Heinemann; New York: G.P. Putnam's Sons. 1913. Greek text available at the Perseus Digital Library.
Tzetzes, John, Allegories of the Odyssey translated by Goldwyn, Adam J. and Kokkini, Dimitra. Dumbarton Oaks Medieval Library, Harvard University Press, 2015. 

Achaeans (Homer)
People of the Trojan War
Laconian mythology